Runnells is a city in the southeastern corner of Polk County, Iowa, United States. The population was 457 at the time of the 2020 census. It is part of the Des Moines–West Des Moines Metropolitan Statistical Area.

History
Runnells incorporated as a city on May 21, 1903. It was named for John S. Runnells, a former editorial writer for the Iowa State Register and private secretary for Governor Samuel Merrill.

Geography

Demographics

2010 census
As of the census of 2010, there were 507 people, 179 households, and 135 families living in the city. The racial makeup of the city was 97.0% White, 0.2% African American, 0.8% Native American, 0.4% Asian, 0.2% from other races, and 1.4% from two or more races. Hispanic or Latino of any race were 1.4% of the population.

There were 179 households, of which 45.8% had children under the age of 18 living with them, 61.5% were married couples living together, 10.1% had a female householder with no husband present, 3.9% had a male householder with no wife present, and 24.6% were non-families. 22.3% of all households were made up of individuals, and 8.9% had someone living alone who was 65 years of age or older. The average household size was 2.83 and the average family size was 3.34.

The median age in the city was 31.9 years. 33.1% of residents were under the age of 18; 6.3% were between the ages of 18 and 24; 31.4% were from 25 to 44; 18.7% were from 45 to 64; and 10.7% were 65 years of age or older. The gender makeup of the city was 51.3% male and 48.7% female.

2000 census
As of the census of 2000, there were 352 people, 143 households, and 96 families living in the city. The racial makeup of the city was 98.58% White, 0.28% Native American, and 1.14% from two or more races.

There were 143 households, out of which 32.2% had children under the age of 18 living with them, 58.0% were married couples living together, 7.7% had a female householder with no husband present, and 32.2% were non-families. 29.4% of all households were made up of individuals, and 16.8% had someone living alone who was 65 years of age or older. The average household size was 2.46 and the average family size was 3.05.

26.1% are under the age of 18, 6.5% from 18 to 24, 27.8% from 25 to 44, 25.6% from 45 to 64, and 13.9% who were 65 years of age or older. The median age was 36 years. For every 100 females, there were 91.3 males. For every 100 females age 18 and over, there were 92.6 males.

The median income for a household in the city was $41,250, and the median income for a family was $50,000. Males had a median income of $36,458 versus $26,563 for females. The per capita income for the city was $17,643. None of the families and 2.8% of the population were living below the poverty line, including no under eighteens and 9.3% of those over 64.

Notable person
 Dennis Keeney grew up on the Keeney Place/ family farm near Runnells

See also

 List of cities in Iowa

References

External links

Cities in Polk County, Iowa
Cities in Iowa
Des Moines metropolitan area
Populated places established in 1903
1903 establishments in Iowa